The Evening Mail is the common name of several newspapers, including:

The Birmingham Evening Mail
The North-West Evening Mail
The Nelson Evening Mail (no longer in production)
The Dublin Evening Mail
The New York Evening Mail (now the New York World-Telegram)